Palacio de los Deportes de La Rioja is an arena in Logroño, Spain. The arena holds 3,809 people, expandable to 4,500 people with additional seats.

It is primarily used for handball and basketball. This is the home arena of CB Ciudad de Logroño and CB Clavijo.

External links
Palacio de los Deportes at La Rioja website

Handball venues in Spain
Indoor arenas in Spain
Basketball venues in Spain
Sports venues in La Rioja (Spain)
Sport in Logroño